Dicranophoridae is a family of rotifers belonging to the order Ploima.

Genera
The following genera are accepted by the World Register of Marine Species:
 Albertia Dujardin, 1838
 Aspelta Harring & Myers, 1928
 Dicranophorus Nitzsch, 1827
 Encentrum Ehrenberg, 1838
 Erignatha Harring & Myers, 1922
 Glaciera Jersabek, 1999
 Myersinella Wiszniewski, 1936
 Paradicranophorus Wiszniewski, 1929
 Wierzejskiella Wiszniewski, 1934
 Wigrella Wiszniewski, 1932

References

Ploima
Rotifer families